Albert Serra (born 9 October 1975) is a Spanish independent filmmaker and manager of the production company Andergraun Films, set up by Montse Triola primarily to produce Serra's films. He is best known for his films Story of My Death (2013), The Death of Louis XIV (2016), starring Jean-Pierre Léaud, and Pacifiction (2022).

Selected filmography

Feature films

Short films

Film installations

Accolades 

Other awards:
 Honor of the Knights (2006)
 2006 Viennale Directors' Fortnight – FIPRESCI Prize
 Best Feature Film, also Holden Award for Best Script – Special Mention, at the 2006 Torino Film Festival
 Grand Prize at the 2006 Entrevues Belfort film festival
 Best Emerging Director and Best Film in Catalan Language awards, 2006 Barcelona Cinema Awards
 Selected by Cahiers du Cinéma as one of the 10 best films of 2007. 
 Birdsong (2008)
 2008 Cannes Directors' Fortnight
 Grand Prize at the 2008 Split International Film Festival
 Grand Prize at the 2008 Entrevues Belfort film festival
 Story of My Death (2013)
 Golden Leopard at the Locarno International Film Festival
 Silver Puma for Best Director at the 2014 UNAM International Film Festival (FICUNAM)
 Best wardrobe at the 2014 Gaudí Awards
 The Death of Louis XIV (2016)

 Toronto International Film Festival – Official Selection
 New York Film Festival – Official Selection
 Winner in feature film category, 2016 Prix Jean Vigo
 Best International Film at the 2016 Jerusalem Film Festival
Pacifiction (2022)
10th Feroz Awards – Nomination for the Arrebato Award (Fiction)

References

External links
 Albert Serra's Andergraun Films website. .
 Albert Serra on Facebook
 Undergraun Films on Facebook
 
 "Albert Serra: Radical Classicist", Harvard Film Archives. Retrieved 2016-09-03.
 "Albert Serra: Divine Visionaries and Holy Fools", Tate Modern. Retrieved 2016-09-03.
 "Locarno Film Festival Review: Dracula Meets Casanova In Albert Serra's Bizarrely Fascinating ‘The Story of My Death’", by Eric Kohn, IndieWire, 13 August 2013.

1975 births
Living people
Spanish film directors
People from Girona